Adlafia is a genus of diatoms belonging to the family Anomoeoneidaceae.

The genus was first described in 1998.

Species:
 Adlafia minuscula (Grunow) Lange-Bertalot

References

Cymbellales
Diatom genera